Harardhere is a historic town in the Mudug province of Somalia. It is situated in the autonomous Galmudug state and serves as the capital of the Harardhere District.

History
For most of its history, Harardhere was a historic town that was included in many Somali sultanates like the Ajuran Sultanate and Hiraab Imamate, who ruled over the town since 13th century. After Somalia gained independence, the town developed and gave birth to many prominent Somali politicians and military officials like Abdirashid Ali Shermarke the second president of Somalia, Maj. Gen Daud Abdulle Hirsi the first Commander of the Somali Armed Forces, Maj. Gen Mohamed Abshir Muse First Commander of the Somali Police Force and Maj. Gen Salaad Gabeyre Kediye.

The town has been controlled by the Al Qa'ida-linked terrorist group al-Shabaab since at least 2012. In 2018, a US airstrike killed 60 al-Shabaab fighters at a training camp in a rural area outside the town.

On 16 January 2022, the town is recaptured by the Somali Forces.

Demographics
As of 2005, Harardhere  had a population of around 65,543 inhabitants. As with most of Galmudug, it is primarily inhabited by Somalis from the Hiraab sub-clan of the Hawiye.

Notable residents
Abdirashid Ali Shermarke, second president of Somalia
Daud Abdulle Hirsi, first Somali Armed Forces commander
Mohamed Abshir Muse, first Somali Police Force commander
Salaad Gabeyre Kediye, former  Somali senior military commander
Ahmed Mohamed Jimale, former Chief of staff of Somalia National Army

References

Populated places in Mudug
Galmudug
Populated coastal places in Somalia